The Crawford Street Bridge was a concrete and steel bridge over the Providence River in downtown Providence, Rhode Island. It was originally built from 1873 to 1904 and then rebuilt starting in 1930.

As part of a downtown redevelopment project, the massive bridge was substantially demolished in 1982, replaced with several narrower bridges for individual streets and exposing the Providence River to create a more pedestrian-friendly cityscape.

See also

References

External links 
 

Buildings and structures in Providence, Rhode Island
Bridges in Providence County, Rhode Island
Buildings and structures demolished in 1982